Cinque is Italian for five, and may refer to:

Places
 Cinque Ports, five English ports making up the Confederation of the Cinque Ports
 Cinque Terre, five coastal villages in the province of La Spezia in Italy
 Cinque Island, an island in the Andaman archipelago, India

People
 Joseph Cinqué (c. 1814–c. 1879), leader of the La Amistad slave revolt
 Cinque Mtume or Donald DeFreeze (1943–1974), leader of the Symbionese Liberation Army
 Flaminia Cinque, English actress (born 1964)
 Joe Cinque, Australian murder victim
 Guglielmo Cinque, linguist

Characters
 Cinque Nakajima, in the Magical Girl Lyrical Nanoha series
 Cinque Izumi, in the Japanese TV series Dog Days

See also
 
 Cinq (disambiguation), French for five
 Cinco (disambiguation)
 Cinquecento, the Renaissance in literature and art in the sixteenth century
 Fiat Cinquecento, a model of car
 Sink (disambiguation)